Eutychide is a genus of skippers in the family Hesperiidae.

Species
Eutychide complana (Herrich-Schäffer, 1869)
Eutychide olympia (Plötz, 1882)
Eutychide paria (Plötz, 1882)
Eutychide physcella (Hewitson, [1866])
Eutychide subcordata (Herrich-Schäffer, 1869)

Former species
Eutychide asema (Mabille, 1891) - transferred to Adlerodea asema (Mabille, 1891)
Eutychide gertschi Bell, 1937 - transferred to Rhomba gertschi (Bell, 1937)
Eutychide lycortas Godman, 1900 - transferred to Corta lycortas (Godman, 1900)
Eutychide maculata Bell, 1930 - transferred to Justinia maculata (Bell, 1930)
Eutychide orthos Godman, [1900] - transferred to Orthos orthos (Godman, [1900])
Eutychide rastaca (Schaus, 1902) - transferred to Eutus rastaca (Schaus, 1902)
Eutychide submetallescens Hayward, 1940 - transferred to Mnasitheus submetallescens (Hayward, 1940)
Eutychide subpunctata Hayward, 1940 - transferred to Adlerodea subpunctata (Hayward, 1940)

References

External links
Natural History Museum Lepidoptera genus database

Hesperiinae
Hesperiidae genera
Taxa named by Frederick DuCane Godman